Ploča may refer to:

 Ploče, a town in Croatia
 Ploča (mountain), a mountain on the border of Albania and the Republic of Macedonia
 Ploča (Aleksandrovac), a village in Serbia
 Ploča (Bosilegrad), a village in Serbia
 Ploča (Gornji Vakuf), a village in Bosnia and Herzegovina
 Ploča, Prozor, a village in Bosnia and Herzegovina
 Ploča (Loznica), a village in Serbia
 Cape Planka (also known as Ploča), a cape in Croatia